The 2020 Allsvenskan, part of the 2020 Swedish football season, was the 96th season of Allsvenskan since its establishment in 1924. A total of 16 teams participated. Djurgårdens IF were the defending champions after winning the title in the previous season.

The 2020 Allsvenskan season was scheduled to begin on 4 April and end on 8 November 2020 (not including play-off matches), but due to the COVID-19 pandemic in Sweden the opening games of the season were delayed. On 4 June 2020, the Swedish government and the Public Health Agency of Sweden announced that the travel restrictions within Sweden were lifted. There were therefore no restrictions that were prohibiting resuming league play in Sweden and the Swedish Football Association announced, also on 4 June 2020, that the 2020 Allsvenskan season would resume on 14 June 2020.

Malmö FF won the Swedish championship this season, their 24th Allsvenskan title and 21st Swedish championship overall, in the 27th round on 8 November 2020 when they won 4–0 against IK Sirius at home.

Effects of the COVID-19 pandemic
The season was scheduled to begin on 4 April, but was postponed indefinitely on 19 March due to the COVID-19 pandemic in Sweden. On 17 April, a target start date of 14 June was established for the competition by chairman of the Swedish Football Association, Karl-Erik Nilsson. It was initially speculated that matches would not be played behind closed doors, as the country had not gone into lockdown like other European countries at the time. The guidelines and rules issued by the Swedish government and the Public Health Agency of Sweden did however prevent a start of the 2020 Allsvenskan, as they advised against all non-essential travel within Sweden, which would limit the possibilities of Allsvenskan teams to travel to the Allsvenskan games. On 4 June 2020, it was announced that the Swedish travel restrictions were lifted and there were therefore no restrictions preventing Allsvenskan to resume play. The Swedish Football Association accordingly announced, also on 4 June 2020, that the 2020 Allsvenskan season would commence on 14 June 2020.

New guidelines regarding league play were issued on 8 June 2020, which detailed that due to the ban on gathering of more than 50 people in Sweden, all games were to be played without any attendance. Other guidelines included that no players with symptoms were allowed to travel or play and that the travel option with the most limited number of social contacts should be used (which means bus travel for the majority of teams).

Teams

A total of sixteen teams are contesting the league, including fourteen sides from the previous season, and two promoted teams from the 2019 Superettan.

GIF Sundsvall and AFC Eskilstuna were relegated at the end of the 2019 season after finishing at the bottom two places of the table, and were replaced by the 2019 Superettan champions Mjällby AIF and runners-up Varbergs BoIS.

Stadiums and locations

Personnel and kits
All teams are obligated to have the logo of the league sponsor Unibet as well as the Allsvenskan logo on the right sleeve of their shirt.

Note: Flags indicate national team as has been defined under FIFA eligibility rules. Players and Managers may hold more than one non-FIFA nationality.

Managerial changes

League table

Positions by round

Results by round

Results

Relegation play-offs
The 14th-placed team of Allsvenskan met the third-placed team from 2020 Superettan in a two-legged tie on a home-and-away basis with the team from Allsvenskan finishing at home.

Kalmar FF won 4–1 on aggregate.

Season statistics

Top scorers

Top assists

Hat-tricks

Discipline

Player
 Most yellow cards: 10
 Jesper Karlström (Djurgården)

 Most red cards: 3
 Simon Strand (Elfsborg)

Club
 Most yellow cards: 49
 Hammarby IF

 Most red cards: 5
 IF Elfsborg

Awards

Annual awards

See also

Competitions
 2020 Superettan
 2020 Division 1
 2019–20 Svenska Cupen
 2020–21 Svenska Cupen

Team seasons
 2020 Hammarby IF season
 2020 Malmö FF season

References

External links
 

2020
1
Sweden
Sweden
Allsvenskan